The Battle of Brest (1596) was fought on September 19, 1596 between the Ottoman forces of Achmed Hafis Pasha, Beylerbey of Vidin, and the Germanic and Croatian forces led by Ivan Drašković, Ban of Croatia. The battle was a part of the Croatian–Ottoman wars and Ottoman–Habsburg wars between the Ottoman Empire and the Habsburg monarchy.

Prelude 

Brest is a village near Petrinja, on the left bank of the Kupa river. In 1562, a small fortress (lat. castellum) was built there in order to defend against frequent Ottoman raids. In 1592, Hasan Pasha Predojević built the fortress of Petrinja nearby, and defeated a joint Styrian-Croatian army gathered to oppose him in the battle of Brest. After their victory, the Ottomans sacked and burned the fortress of Brest and raided Turopolje region.

Battle 
Forces of Ahmed Hafis Pasha, Beylerbey of Vidin, reinforced by troops of Bosnian Beylerbey Hodaberdi, besieged Petrinja on September 10, 1596. In response, by September 19, 5,000 - 6,000 Christian troops gathered on the left bank of the Kupa river, under Croatian ban Ivan Drašković, colonel Juraj Lenković, and Johan Herberstein of the Military Frontier.

Judging their forces too few to cross the Kupa against the Ottoman defenders, they moved towards Sisak in order to cross the river there and move on to lift the siege of Petrinja. Movement of Croatian troops was interpreted as a retreat by the Ottomans, so the Bosnian beylerbey crossed the river with a cavalry force in order to pursue the enemy. In response, Croatian troops quickly turned back and scattered the pursuers after a short skirmish, forcing them into the Kupa river.

Aftermath 
This skirmish broke the morale of the Ottoman army besieging Petrinja, who lifted the siege on the same day and started a retreat.

Bibliography
Vojna enciklopedija (1970–76), 10 volumes, Vojno izdavački zavod Beograd, book 2, p. 8, article Brest

References

Battles involving Habsburg Croatia
Battles involving the Ottoman Empire
Conflicts in 1596
Brest
History of Banovina
History of Sisak-Moslavina County
1590s in Croatia